This is a list of notable events in music that took place in the 1410s.

Events
1410 
3 April – Henry V is crowned King of England, and appoints Robert Gilbert Dean of the Chapel Royal.
1412
Antonio Zacara da Teramo is recorded as a singer in the chapel of Antipope John XXIII in Bologna.
1413
Richard Loqueville begins teaching music at Cambrai Cathedral. He is thought to have taught Guillaume Du Fay there.
1414
Matteo da Perugia returns from a stay of several years in Pisa, to work at Milan Cathedral.
1415
Ugolino of Forlì becomes a canon at Forlì.

Compositions
1412
Antonio da Cividale – "Strenua/Gaudeat"

Publications
1413
Xinkan Taiyin Daquan

Births
1410
probable
Johannes Ockeghem, Flemish composer (d. 1497)
Conrad Paumann, blind German organist, lutenist and composer (d. 1473)
John Plummer, English composer (d. c.1483)
1415
probable
Johannes Fedé, French composer (d. c.1477)
1418
probable 
Henry Abyngdon, English singer, organist and composer (d. 1497)

Deaths
1411
December – Johannes Ciconia, Flemish composer and music theorist (b. c.1370)
1415
date unknown – Andrea da Firenze, organist and composer
1416
date unknown – Matteo da Perugia, magister cappellae of Milan Cathedral
1417
date unknown – Johannes Cesaris, French composer active at the Burgundian court
1418
date unknown – Richard Loqueville, French harpist and composer
1419
probable – John Cook(e), English composer

References

15th century in music
Music